"Star Collector" is a song written by Gerry Goffin and Carole King in 1967 and recorded by The Monkees (with lead vocals by Davy Jones). The song is included on their fourth album Pisces, Aquarius, Capricorn & Jones Ltd. It was featured in five second-season episodes of their television series: "The Wild Monkees", "Hitting the High Seas", "Monkees Watch Their Feet", "Monkees in Paris" and "Monkees Mind Their Manor". "The Wild Monkees" uses an early mix of the song (without Moog synthesizer), and the other episodes use the released mix.

The song is about the phenomenon of groupies and takes a dismissive attitude toward them ("Think I'll let her keep on going, wherever it is she's going to / Give her an autograph and tell her 'It's been nice knowing you'...It won't take much time / Before I get her off my mind").

The Monkees's version of the song was one of the early pop records to include a Moog synthesizer, played and programmed by synthesist Paul Beaver. Peter Tork didn't think much of Beaver's performance and told Rhino Records later "He played it like it was a flute or something," preferring Micky Dolenz's random use of the Moog on "Daily Nightly" (which appeared on Pisces) to produce spacey sounds.

Personnel 
Lead vocal by Davy Jones
Harmony vocals: Micky Dolenz
Backing vocals: Micky Dolenz, Davy Jones, Chip Douglas
Spoken words: Micky Dolenz
Electric guitar: Michael Nesmith
Bass: Chip Douglas
Drums: Eddie Hoh
Organ: Peter Tork
Moog synthesizer: Paul Beaver

References

The Monkees songs
Songs with lyrics by Gerry Goffin
Songs written by Carole King
Songs about groupies
1967 songs